Reginald Byron Jones-Sawyer, Sr. (born January 14, 1957) is an American politician currently serving in the California State Assembly. He is a Democrat representing the 59th Assembly District, which encompasses portions of South Central Los Angeles, the neighborhoods of Florence-Graham and Walnut Park, and a part of Huntington Park.

Jones-Sawyer is a member of the California Legislative Black Caucus, and served as Chair from 2015-2016. Before being elected to the Assembly in 2012, he was Assistant Deputy Mayor for the City of Los Angeles. Jones-Sawyer terms out of the Assembly in December 2024. Jones-Sawyer announced in February 2023 that he is running for the City of Los Angeles Council District 10 seat.

Members of the Jones-Sawyer family were early pioneers in the civil rights movement. His uncle, Jefferson Thomas, was one of the "Little Rock Nine" high school students.

Early life and education

Jones-Sawyer earned his Bachelor of Science degree in Public Administration from the University of Southern California and has been an active member of the Alumni Association and past President of the Black Alumni Association; he also completed the prestigious Harvard University, Kennedy School of Government's Program for Senior Executives in State and Local Government.

Early career

Jones-Sawyer's history of public service includes serving as Director of Asset Management for the City of Los Angeles, Assistant Deputy Mayor for the City of Los Angeles, Chair of the Los Angeles County Small Business Commission, Vice President of SEIU's (Local 721) Los Angeles Professional Managers Association, and statewide Secretary of the California Democratic Party.

While working for the City of Los Angeles, Jones-Sawyer helped transform the city's complicated and complex permit development bureaucratic system into a more "customer-friendly" agency that expedited the processing of many huge developments, including the building of the Magic Johnson Theater (now the Rave) in Baldwin Hills) and the Staples Center Arena.

Legislative career

Jones-Sawyer has authored or co-authored legislation including: AB 672 that provides re-entry assistance - like housing and job training - for persons that have been wrongfully convicted and consequently released from state prison; AB 266 that provides proper regulatory oversight of the cultivation, manufacture, transportation, storage distribution and sale of medical marijuana; and AB1012 that prohibits school districts from assigning any student to a course period without educational content, a.k.a., Fake Classes bills.

In the Legislature, Jones-Sawyer is Chair of the Assembly Public Safety Committee and serves on the following standing committees: Higher Education Committee, Government Organization Committee, and the Agriculture Committee. He is Chair of the Select Committee on Urban Planning and Land Use in Underserved Communities, and Co-Chair of the Select Committee on the Status of Boys and Men of Color.

Jones-Sawyer recognized the devastation the School-to-Prison-Pipeline posed for underserved communities like those in his district, which has high incarceration rates for African Americans and Latinos in particular. That is why as Chair of the Public Safety subcommittee, he led the way to secure nearly $100 million for recidivism reduction grants. For the first time since the great recession, millions of dollars in grants were made available to service providers to help turn-around the lives of the formally incarcerated so that they could become productive residents in their communities. His subcommittee also has the enormous responsibility of overseeing the entire budget for the state's court system. Partnering with the Chief Justice and working with judges throughout the state, he helped to restored over $300 million to the court system after a decade of devastating budget cuts.

Jones-Sawyer also served as Chair of the California Legislative Black Caucus from 2014-2016.

In 2021, Jones-Sawyer sought to change the statewide entry requirements for police officers with AB89, which would've required at least a bachelor's degree or at least 25 years of age before entering a police academy. He argued that research suggested that people's brains don't fully mature until they're at least 25 years old. This argument has been used as a basis for a law in 2017, allowing those under 26 years old with lengthy prison sentences to pursue a special parole program.

2014 California State Assembly

2016 California State Assembly

2018 California State Assembly

2020 California State Assembly

Legislative history

2013-14 Legislation

AB 392 – Efficiencies in State Government 

Requires the Controller to determine the most cost-effective allocation method if $1,000 or less is appropriated for a program and would eliminate a duplicate reporting requirement.

AB 410 - Firefighters Retirement Health Benefits

Allows retired firefighters to reinstate employment without permanently losing retiree health care benefits.

AB 436 – Inverse Condemnation

Expressly makes applicable the doctrine of comparative fault to litigation between a plaintiff property owner and a defendant governmental agency in inverse condemnation actions. In addition the bill would also expressly ensure that CCP Section 998 applies to governmental agencies in inverse actions in a fair and equitable manner consistent with the original purpose of the statute.

AB 450 – Direct Electoral Representation

Requires the governing board of the Los Angeles Community College District to establish trustee districts and that trustee board members then be elected by those districts.

AB 549 - Campus Safety/ Campus Mental Health

Requires school districts better define within their school safety plans the role of police on campus. It will also require school and school districts to prioritize campus safety funding for intervention workers, counselors, and other supportive mental health service providers.

AB 570 – Continuation Schools: Voluntary Placement

Requires school districts to establish and adopt policies and procedures for governing the identification, placement and intake procedures for pupils who voluntarily enroll in continuation schools.

AB 648 – Court Reporters

Establishes the requirement of a fee of $30 for each proceeding that lasts one hour or less in a civil action or case to offset the costs of the services of official court reporters in civil proceedings.

AB 752 – Work Furloughs: County Jails

Allows individuals who were sentenced to local supervision under realignment, to be served in a Work Furlough Program if the person is deemed suitable by the Work Furlough Administrator.

AB 805 – Pre Trial Report Clarification

Allows a judge or magistrate to take into consideration information included in a report prepared in accordance with Section 1318.1.

AB 870 – The Fair Chance Employment Act

Prohibits any persons or entities that contract with the State of California, from inquiring about the criminal history of a potential employee until after the initial employment application.

AB 915 – Youth Community Incentives Act

Allocates 75% of future savings from the state's shrinking youth correctional facilities, directly to counties in the form of a Youthful Offender Block Grant Part B, for the purpose of serving high-needs youth offenders locally.

AB 921 – Social Worker Empowerment Act

Allows social workers to be at the table when discussing improving the foster care system and contains whistleblower protection for social workers

AB 1062 – Cal HR Clean-up

Makes technical amendments to the Civil Service Act and one related Penal Code provision (regarding psychological screening of peace officers) to clarify the operating authority of CalHR as established by GRP 1 in order to support the reorganization and to permit greater efficiency and streamlining of operations now and in the future.

AB 1342 – Gaming Establishments

Creates an expedited process for applications for gambling establishments.

 2015-16 Legislation

AB 26, Medical Marijuana Regulations

Enacts the Medical Cannabis Regulation and Control Act and would create the Division of Medical Cannabis Regulation and Enforcement within the Department of Alcoholic Beverage Control.

AB 167, I Poker

Establishes a framework for the authorization and regulation of internet poker (iPoker) within the state of California.

AB 224, Foster Youth Notice of Bill of Rights

Requires the State Department of Education, in consultation with the California Foster Youth Education Task Force, to develop a standardized notice of the education rights of foster children, and to post the notice on its Internet Web site.

AB 256, Electronic Evidence Protection

Amends Penal Code Section 141 to specify that "any physical matter" includes digital images and video recordings.

AB 267, Mandate Disclosure of Rights Given Up Before Plea Deal

Requires the court, when the defendant first appears for arraignment on a felony charge, to inform the defendant that accepting a plea and a felony conviction results in the loss of certain privileges.

AB 337, Teacher Tax Credit 
Allows K-12 teachers, in their first three years of consecutive service at public and private schools, to claim individual tax credits for out of pocket expenses incurred for the purchase of instructional materials and classroom supplies. Eligible teachers can receive a credit for up to $250 of any unreimbursed expenses.

AB 324, Allow Felons to Serve on Juries

Eliminate the blanket exclusion of people with felony convictions from jury service by reinstating their civil right to jury eligibility and service.

AB 351, Small Business Procurement

Requires all state entities receiving public funding to establish and achieve a 25% small business participation rate for state procurement contracts.

AB 396, Ban the Box for Housing

Adds people with criminal records as a protected class to Government Code Section 12955 and prohibits using a criminal record as a basis upon which housing decisions occurs.

AB 529, Armed Prohibited Persons System

Restricts the renewal of a driver's license or vehicle registration for anyone on the Prohibited Armed Persons file (PC 30000-30015) that has failed to surrender their weapon(s) as required by law.

AB 610, Child Support Arrears

Clarifies that the suspension of child support order occurs by operation of law for those who are incarcerated and gives LCSA's administrative authority indefinitely to modify arrears for incarcerated Obligors to zero.

AB 672, Services for Wrongfully Convicted Persons

Provides reentry assistance for persons that have been wrongfully convicted and subsequently released from state prison

AB 696, Probable Cause Determination Hearings

Requires prompt probable cause determination hearings for out of custody misdemeanants.

AB 708, Labeling of Cleaning Products

Requires ingredient disclosure on both product labels and Internet Web sites for most kinds of cleaning products sold to consumers and businesses.

AB 769, State Employee Discipline

Streamlines the process for investigating employees accused of wrongdoing to ensure it is conducted as efficiently and timely as possible.

AB 926,Earned Compliance Credits and Re-Entry Services Fund, Creates an earned compliance credit program that provides eligible parolees with the opportunity to reduce their period of parole supervision upon compliance with their parole conditions. Savings from the reduced parole supervision shall be reinvested into job training and housing support for state parolees to reduce recidivism.

AB 1012, Empty Class Periods/Jefferson High School

Prohibits school districts from assigning any pupil to a course period without educational content and create a system for providing technical assistance and support for districts that are relying on such courses.

AB 1203, Disaster Response Initiative

Establishes the Disaster Response Fund within the State Treasury to fund disaster and emergency response activities of the Office of Emergency Services.

AB 1301, Pre-Clearance Voting Rights Act

Establishes a preclearance process for proposed voting related laws, regulations, and policies.

References

External links 
 
 Campaign website
 Join California Reginald Byron Jones-Sawyer Sr.

Democratic Party members of the California State Assembly
Living people
1957 births
Politicians from Little Rock, Arkansas
Politicians from Los Angeles
African-American state legislators in California
21st-century American politicians
21st-century African-American politicians
20th-century African-American people